The 2021 South Florida Bulls football team represented the University of South Florida (USF) during the 2021 NCAA Division I FBS football season. The Bulls were led by second-year head coach Jeff Scott and played their home games at Raymond James Stadium in Tampa, Florida. This season was the ninth for the Bulls as members of the American Athletic Conference and 25th season overall.

Previous season

The Bulls finished the 2020 season 1–8, 0–7 in AAC play to finish in eleventh place in the conference.

Staff

Preseason

American Athletic Conference preseason media poll

The American Athletic Conference preseason media poll was released at the virtual media day held August 4, 2021. Cincinnati, who finished the 2020 season ranked No. 8 nationally, was tabbed as the preseason favorite in the 2021 preseason media poll.

Schedule

Source:

Game summaries

at NC State

No. 13 Florida

Florida A&M

at No. 15 BYU

at SMU

Tulsa

Temple

at East Carolina

Houston

No. 5 Cincinnati

at Tulane

at UCF

References

South Florida
South Florida Bulls football seasons
South Florida Bulls football